is an interchange passenger railway station located in the city of Tama, Tokyo, Japan operated jointly by the private railway companies Keio Corporation and Odakyū Electric Railway and the Tokyo Tama Intercity Monorail Company. The stations are formally known as Keiō Tama-Center (Keiō), Odakyū Tama-Center (Odakyū), and Tama-Center (Tama Monorail).

Stations

Keiō Corporation (Keiō Tama-Center Station)
The station opened on 18 October 1974. Four elevated tracks serve two island platforms. All trains stop at this station.

Odakyū Electric Railway (Odakyū Tama-Center Station)
The station opened on 23 April 1975. Two elevated tracks serve two island platforms. All trains stop at this station.

Tama Toshi Monorail (Tama-Center Station)
The station opened on 10 January 2000. This is a raised station with two tracks and two opposed side platforms, with the station building located underneath. It is a standardized station building for this monorail line.

Surrounding area
The station sits at the heart of the planned Tama New Town suburb, and as such is home to most of the area's main commercial and municipal buildings. There are numerous shopping centers centered on a pedestrian mall on the station's south side. Sanrio Puroland is located (about 200 meters) south-east of the station.

History
 18 October 1974: Keiō Tama-Center Station opens as a local, rapid, and commuter rapid stop with the extension of the Keiō Sagamihara Line.
 23 April 1975: Odakyū Tama-Center Station opens as a local stop with the extension of the Odakyū Tama Line.
 28 May 1992: Special express trains begin service on the Sagamihara Line, stopping at Tama-Center.
 10 January 2000: Tama Toshi Monorail Tama-Center Station opens.
 2 December 2000: Special express Homeway and express trains begin service on the Tama Line, stopping at Tama-Center.
 25 March 2001: On the Sagamihara Line, express trains begin service, stopping at Tama-Center; special express trains are abolished.
 23 March 2002: Tama Express trains begin service on the Tama Line, stopping at Tama-Center.
 11 December 2004: Section semi-express trains begin service on the Tama Line, stopping at Tama-Center.
 May 2005 – March 2006: Odakyū Tama-Center Station undergoes renovation.
 15 March 2008: Special express Metro Homeway trains begin service on the Tama Line, stopping at Tama-Center.
 February 2018: The Tama Toshi Monorail was assigned station numner TT-01

Passenger statistics
In fiscal 2019, the Keio station was used by an average of 90,353 passengers daily. During the same period, the Odakyu station was used by an average of 51,315 passengers daily. The Tama Monorail station was used by 37,449 passengers daily.

See also
 List of railway stations in Japan

References

External links

 Keiō Tama-Center Station—Keiō Corporation 
 Odakyū Tama-Center Station—Odakyū Electric Railway 
 Tama Monorail Takahatafudō Station 

Railway stations in Tokyo
Tama Toshi Monorail
Stations of Odakyu Electric Railway
Keio Sagamihara Line
Odakyu Tama Line
Railway stations in Japan opened in 1974
Tama, Tokyo